Christina Paakkari (formerly known as Charlie/Charles Paakkari) is an audio engineer for Capitol Records and the recipient of a 2005 Grammy Award for her work on the Dianne Reeves album Good Night, and Good Luck.

Career 
Paakkari has recorded many artists in the music business, including 
The Carpenters
Dwight Yoakam
Tony Bennett 
Bette Midler 
Elton John
Harry Connick, Jr.
Leah Curtis
Verne Langdon
Les Paul
Natalie Cole
Pat Benatar
Los Lobos
LeAnn Rimes
Fourplay
Michael Feinstein
Sting
Doc Severinsen
Frank Sinatra
Elliott Smith
Ozzy Osbourne
Dave Grusin
Wendy Carlos (Tron)
13th Floor Elevators

References

External links
Charlie Paakkari's biography at Capitol Studios

Charles Paakkari at AllMusic
https://www.discogs.com/artist/546169-Charlie-Paakkari?type=Credits&filter_anv=0

Living people
Audio production engineers
Year of birth missing (living people)
Women audio engineers
American audio engineers